IFAF Africa is the governing body of American football in Africa. It is a member of the International Federation of American Football.

Members

2022
Africa (11)
 - 2006
 - 2014
 - 2018
 - 2012
 - 2019
 - 2015
 - 2018
 - 2017
 - 2019
 - 2020
 - ?

See also 
 Egyptian Federation of American Football
 Ghana American Football Federation

External links
  IFAF Africa on the IFAF website

International Federation of American Football
Sports governing bodies in Africa
American football governing bodies